Round Midnight is a 1986 musical drama film directed by Bertrand Tavernier and written by Tavernier and David Rayfiel. It stars Dexter Gordon, François Cluzet, and Herbie Hancock, the latter of whom also composed the film's soundtrack. Martin Scorsese, Philippe Noiret, and Wayne Shorter appear in cameos.

The protagonist jazzman, Dale Turner, is based on a composite of real-life jazz legends Lester Young (tenor sax) and Bud Powell (piano). While the film is fictionalized, it is drawn directly from the memoir/biography Dance of the Infidels written by French author Francis Paudras, who had befriended Powell during his Paris expatriate days and on whom the character Francis was based. The film is a wistful and tragic portrait that captures the Paris jazz scene of the 1950s.

Gordon was nominated for the Academy Award for Best Actor and won a Grammy for the film's soundtrack entitled The Other Side of Round Midnight in the category for Best Instrumental Jazz Performance, Soloist. Hancock won the Academy Award for Best Original Score. The soundtrack was released in two parts: Round Midnight and The Other Side of Round Midnight.

Synopsis
In 1950s New York, Dale Turner is an accomplished saxophone player barely getting by playing at local jazz clubs and struggling with substance abuse, particularly of alcohol. After talking with a fellow musician who is currently disabled by illness, Dale decides to try to improve his life by traveling to Paris and making a living playing at  jazz club until his luck gets better.

Turner arrives in Paris and is befriended by Francis, a struggling French graphic designer specializing in film posters and who lives with his daughter, his marriage having broken up. Francis idolizes the musician and tries desperately to help him escape alcohol abuse. With time, and after Francis allows Turner to move in with him and his daughter, Turner manages to put himself on his own feet again and starts to get by without a reliance on alcohol. He eventually decides it is time to go home to New York to see his old friends and to re-acquaint himself with his own daughter.

Francis accompanies Dale, and the music community in New York is ready to accept the musician back. He writes a song dedicated to his daughter in the hope of strengthening their relationship after much time apart. He invites her to the club to hear its debut, but manages to confuse her true age and tells the audience she has just turned 15; she is actually 14, and she makes note of this to Francis, who is seated next to her in the audience. Later in the week, when Dale tries to further his bond with her by sharing a meal at a local diner, an old drug dealer recognizes him there, re-introduces himself and implies his supplies are still available to Dale.

Francis tries to intervene a few times to keep Dale protected from his old suppliers, and attempts to keep up with all of them. After Francis eventually leaves and returns to Paris and his daughter, he receives a telegram from Dale's music manager saying that the musician has died in a local hospital.

Cast

Production
Round Midnight was filmed in Paris and New York City. It was produced by Irwin Winkler.

Tavernier defied the film studio by insisting that real-life jazz tenor saxophonist Dexter Gordon play the role of Turner. Gordon, who himself played with Bud Powell in Paris in the early 1960s (and earlier in their careers), helped to revise and rewrite the script. The supporting cast is likewise composed of jazz musicians (mainly from the generation which followed Gordon and Powell) such as Herbie Hancock, Bobby Hutcherson, John McLaughlin, and Wayne Shorter, among others who perform the music throughout the film. The musicians are joined by actors François Cluzet, Gabrielle Haker, Sandra Reaves-Phillips, Lonette McKee, and Christine Pascal.

Soundtrack

The score for the film was composed by Hancock. The soundtrack was in two parts – Round Midnight and The Other Side of Round Midnight – released under Dexter Gordon's name and featuring his last recordings, although he does not appear on all tracks. Both albums were produced and arranged by Hancock.

Reception
Round Midnight received a 96% rating at Rotten Tomatoes from 23 reviews.

Accolades

References

External links
 
 
 

1986 films
1980s musical drama films
African-American biographical dramas
African-American diaspora in Paris
French drama films
1980s English-language films
English-language French films
Films directed by Bertrand Tavernier
Films produced by Irwin Winkler
Films scored by Herbie Hancock
Films set in Paris
Films set in the 1950s
Films that won the Best Original Score Academy Award
Jazz films
Warner Bros. films
1986 drama films
1980s American films
1980s French films